Glengarry is a town in the Gippsland region of Victoria, Australia. At the 2016 census, Glengarry had a population of 1084.

History
Glengarry was established after the railway arrived from Traralgon in 1883.
The Post Office opened on 1 January 1884 as La Trobe Railway Station and was renamed Glengarry in December of that year.

Today
The town has an Australian Rules football team competing in the North Gippsland Football League.

See also
 Glengarry railway station

References

Towns in Victoria (Australia)
City of Latrobe